Sir Adrian Holman KBE CMG MC (22 December 1895 – 6 September 1974) was a British diplomat.

Early life 
The son of Richard Haswell Holman, he was educated at Copthorne Preparatory School, Harrow School, and New College, Oxford.

Career 
He served in British Army with the Royal Artillery during World War I, from 1915 to 1918, and received the Military Cross and was mentioned in despatches.

In 1920, he joined the Diplomatic Service as a Third Secretary, serving in Brussels from 1921 to 1924 (promoted to Second Secretary while there, 1922). In Rome, 1924–1926, then Paris, 1926 to 1931, (becoming First Secretary in 1931). On 30 April 1930 he married the Hon. (Harriet) Anne Tyrrell, only surviving child of William George Tyrrell, Baron Tyrrell of Avon, British Ambassador to France. The wedding, at Notre Dame Cathedral, was the first 'official' wedding of a British subject at the cathedral since the marriage of Mary Queen of Scots and the Dauphin of France in 1558, and was attended by 'vast crowds'; within a year, Mrs Holman had applied to the Pope for an annulment, and Holman accepted a posting as Secretary of Legation at Peking, 1931 to 1935. At the Foreign Office, 1935–1938, then at the British Embassies in Berlin 1938–1939 and The Hague, 1939. In 1940, he married (secondly) Betty, the only daughter of Sir Gilbert Fox, 1st Baronet. Posted to Baghdad, 1940, where he became Counsellor, then to Teheran in 1942 and next the British Mission in Algiers.

In 1944, Holman returned to Paris as Minister, then was British Political Representative in Romania, from 1946 to 1947 and Minister there, 1947–1949. He was Minister Plenipotentiary to Cuba, from 1949, a post which was redesignated as ambassador in 1950. He remained in Cuba until he retired from the Foreign Service in May, 1954.

In retirement, he lived at Bohunt Manor, Liphook, Hampshire, where he indulged his recreations of fishing and gardening. He was a member of the Bath Club in London.

Honours 
Military Cross
Companion of the Order of St Michael and St George, 1936
Coronation Medal, 1937
Coronation Medal, 1953
Chevalier of the Order of Leopold (Belgium)
Knights Commander of the Order of the British Empire, 1954

References

Bibliography 
HOLMAN, Sir Adrian in Who's Who 1974 (London, A. & C. Black, 1974)

1895 births
1974 deaths
People educated at Harrow School
Alumni of New College, Oxford
People educated at Copthorne Preparatory School
Royal Artillery officers
British Army personnel of World War I
Ambassadors of the United Kingdom to Cuba
Ambassadors of the United Kingdom to Romania

Knights Commander of the Order of the British Empire
Companions of the Order of St Michael and St George
Recipients of the Military Cross
People from Liphook